The Harran University, also known as the Madrasa of Harran, was a medieval institution of higher learning in Harran (in modern-day southeastern Turkey), active from the 8th to at least the 12th century and later briefly again in the 16th century. The university was the first Islamic institution of its kind, had a liberal intellectual environment and made Harran renowned as a center of science and learning. Translation activity at the university, particularly the translations of documents from Syriac and Greek into Arabic, was historically important in regard to the transmission and preservation of classical Greek and Syriac learning.

History 
The Harran University was founded by the Umayyad caliph Umar II in 717, who brought many scholars from other cities throughout the lands under his control and installed them in Harran. The university was the first Islamic institution of its kind and has sometimes been regarded as perhaps being the world's oldest university. The university had a liberal intellectual environment and studies were made of religious and intellectual traditions that would have been rejected as heretical in many other places in the world. As a result of the university, Harran reached international renown and flourished as a center of science and learning.

The university enjoyed its golden age in the late 8th century and 9th centuries, particularly under the Abbasid caliph Harun al-Rashid. At its height, more than 8,000 students gathered at the Harran University, educated in mathematics, philosophy, medicine, astrology, astronomy and natural sciences. Many prominent scholars of their age, including Al-Battani, Jabir ibn Hayyan and Thābit ibn Qurra, studied at the Harran University. The university was also an important site for translations of documents from Syriac and Greek into Arabic and thus also an important institution in the history of transmission and preservation of classical Greek and Syriac learning. At some point, Neoplatonism was introduced to the university, though the precise timing is not clear. It might have been brought to Harran by Thābit ibn Qurra in the late 9th century, who could have learnt Neoplatonism in Baghdad. Alternatively, Neoplatonism might have been brought to Harran as early as the 6th century by Neoplatonists such as Simplicius of Cilicia, who fled persecution in the Byzantine Empire.

Though having declined since the 9th century, the university remained active until at least the 12th century, when Harran was under the rule of the Zengid dynasty. It ceased operations at the latest in 1271, when Harran was severely damaged and abandoned. After the Ottoman Empire captured the region containing Harran, Sultan Selim I repaired the university and made an attempt to revive it, though it declined in importance again after his reign.

See also 

 Harran University, a modern university in nearby Urfa
 Islamic Golden Age

References 

Harran
Ancient universities
Islamic Golden Age
Science in the medieval Islamic world
Educational institutions established in the 8th century
Education in the medieval Islamic world